

Champions
Temple Cup: New York Giants over Baltimore Orioles (4–0)
National League: Baltimore Orioles

National League final standings

Statistical leaders

Notable seasons
Boston Beaneaters center fielder Hugh Duffy set the MLB single-season record for batting average (.440). He also led the NL in hits (237), home runs (18), total bases (374), and runs scored (160). He was second in the NL in slugging percentage (.694) and runs batted in (145). He was third in the NL in on-base percentage (.502) and adjusted OPS+ (173).
New York Giants pitcher Amos Rusie had a win–loss record of 36–13 and led the NL in wins (36), earned run average (2.78), adjusted ERA+ (188), and strikeouts (195). He was second in the NL in innings pitched (444).

Events
April 24 – Lave Cross of the Philadelphia Phillies hits for the cycle as the Phillies crush the Brooklyn Bridegrooms, 22-5.
May 30 – Second baseman Bobby Lowe of the Boston Beaneaters becomes the first player in Major League history to hit four home runs in a game, hitting two in a nine-run 3rd inning.  Boston tops the Cincinnati Reds, 20-11.
June 13 – Bill Hassamaer outfielder/infielder for the Washington Senators hits for the cycle against the St. Louis Browns.  Washington wins, 12–3.
July 10 – Jerry Denny of the Louisville Colonels becomes the final position player to play a Major League game without wearing a glove.
August 4 – Baker Bowl, the home stadium of the Philadelphia Phillies, burns down in a fire. The Phillies are forced to play their remaining games at the University of Philadelphia. 
August 17 – Philadelphia Phillies outfielder Sam Thompson hits for the cycle as the Phillies crush the Louisville Colonels, 29-4.
September 3 – The Baltimore Orioles set a Major League record for most triples in a game, with nine against the Cleveland Spiders.
September 28 – Cincinnati Reds pitcher Tom Parrott hits for the cycle against the New York Giants.  New York wins, however, 9-8.

Births

January
January 1 – Hack Miller
January 2 – Bill Wagner
January 3 – John Fluhrer
January 3 – Tom Whelan
January 8 – Art Ewoldt
January 9 – Billy Lee
January 9 – Ira Townsend
January 14 – Art Decatur
January 16 – Moxie Divis
January 18 – Danny Clark
January 25 – Charlie Whitehouse
January 27 – Joe Weiss
January 29 – Otto Rettig
January 31 – Stuffy Stewart

February
February 1 – Walt Golvin
February 1 – Rube Parnham
February 4 – Vern Spencer
February 6 – Pelham Ballenger
February 7 – Charlie Jackson
February 10 – Herb Pennock
February 10 – Cotton Tierney
February 13 – Billy Martin
February 19 – Ernie Cox
February 20 – Suds Sutherland
February 22 – Tom Grubbs
February 22 – Bill Hall
February 23 – José Rodríguez
February 27 – Bob Cone
February 28 – Jud Wilson

March
March 2 – Elmer Myers
March 7 – Frank Gleich
March 7 –  Merwin Jacobson
March 10 – Fred Johnson
March 10 – Jack Wieneke
March 14 – Gene Layden
March 17 – Ralph Shafer
March 19 – Red Torkelson
March 19 – Bill Wambsganss
March 20 – Bill Stellbauer
March 28 – Lee King
March 29 – Dixie Leverett
March 29 – Alex McColl
March 29 – Bob Steele
March 31 – Ben Mallonee
March 31 – Tom Sheehan

April
April 1 – Robert Bonner
April 1 – Hal Reilly
April 2 – Harry O'Donnell
April 5 – Jim Sullivan
April 7 – Fred Lear
April 7 – Horace Milan
April 13 – Pat Martin
April 13 – Lizzie Murphy
April 13 – Squiz Pillion
April 15 – Red Gunkel
April 19 – John Donahue
April 21 – Charlie Maisel
April 22 – Jake Pitler
April 24 – Howard Ehmke

May
May 1 – Paul Carter
May 3 – Cliff Markle
May 8 – Roy Wilkinson
May 15 – Eddie Stumpf
May 16 – Paddy Smith
May 17 – Frank Woodward
May 22 – Hooks Warner
May 23 – Lee McElwee
May 25 – Joe Judge
May 26 – Bill Fincher
May 27 – Frank Snyder
May 30 – Al Mamaux
May 30 – Twink Twining
May 31 – John Sullivan

June
June 10 – Fred Hofmann
June 10 – Roy Sanders
June 11 – Jack Calvo
June 11 – Walt Whittaker
June 13 – Henry Baldwin
June 15 – Mike Cantwell
June 15 – Norm Glockson
June 16 – Bob Glenn
June 27 – Red Bluhm
June 27 – Joe Connolly

July
July 5 – Hod Eller
July 10 – Jim Walsh
July 12 – Lee Meadows
July 13 – Ed Corey
July 13 – George Cunningham
July 16 – Howdy Caton
July 16 – Rich Gee
July 18 – Wilbur Fisher
July 18 – Bill Haeffner
July 18 – Carl Stimson
July 19 – George Brickley
July 25 – Red Holt
July 26 – Larry Woodall
July 28 – John Glaiser
July 30 – Bill Cunningham
July 30 – Chuck Ward

August
August 3 – George Hale
August 3 – Harry Heilmann
August 4 – Sid Benton
August 4 – Jim Grant
August 9 – Leo Kavanagh
August 9 – Johnny Mitchell
August 12 – Paul Carpenter
August 23 – Roy Leslie
August 24 – Jimmy Cooney
August 25 – Buzz Wetzel
August 26 – Sparky Adams
August 27 – Carl East
August 27 – Eddie Mulligan
August 29 – Gus Bono
August 30 – Bing Miller
August 31 – Norman Glaser

September
September 1 – Fred Nicholson
September 4 – Leo Dixon
September 4 – Fred Worden
September 6 – Billy Gleason
September 12 – Ole Olsen
September 13 – Sam Crane
September 13 – Dink O'Brien
September 22 – Frank Walker
September 24 – Otto Neu
September 27 – Mike Loan

October
October 1 – Ray Kolp
October 1 – Duster Mails
October 9 – Jing Johnson
October 10 – Myrl Brown
October 11 – Gary Fortune
October 12 – John Merritt
October 13 – Bob Allen
October 13 – Swede Risberg
October 16 – Mike Menosky
October 18 – Phil Morrison
October 19 – Tim McCabe
October 20 – Toots Coyne
October 20 – Wickey McAvoy
October 23 – Rube Bressler
October 27 – Charlie Bold
October 28 – John Bischoff
October 30 – Harley Dillinger
October 31 – Ken Crawford
October 31 – Ray O'Brien

November
November 1 – Clarence Berger
November 4 – Bill Shanner
November 13 – Ernie Neitzke
November 13 – Ray Steineder
November 18 – Sam Covington
November 20 – Rube Ehrhardt
November 21 – Bill Morrisette
November 23 – Art Corcoran
November 23 – Jesse Petty

December
December 1 – Ernie Alten
December 5 – Philip K. Wrigley
December 6 – Bruno Betzel
December 6 – Walter Mueller
December 8 – Razor Ledbetter
December 10 – Ike Caveney
December 11 – Lou Raymond
December 12 – Charlie Blackwell
December 13 – Larry Jacobus
December 14 – Stan Baumgartner
December 14 – Jim Joe Edwards
December 19 – Ford Frick
December 20 – Butch Henline
December 22 – Harvey McClellan
December 29 – Hank DeBerry
December 31 – Joe Berry
December 31 – Jim Murray

Deaths
January 6 – Marty Sullivan, 31, outfielder who hit .273 in 398 games for the White Stockings, Hoosiers, Beaneaters, and Spiders from 1887 to 1891.
February 28 – Edgar McNabb, 28, pitcher for the 1893 Baltimore Orioles of the National League.
March 3 – Ned Williamson, 36, third baseman and shortstop for the Chicago White Stockings, who set single-season records with 49 doubles in 1883, 27 home runs in 1884, while leading the National League in assists seven times and double plays six times.
March 24 – Mike Jones, 28, Canadian pitcher for the 1890 American Association champion Louisville Colonels.
April 3 – Billy Redmond, 41, shortstop who played for three different teams in two leagues between 1875 and 1878.
April 29 – Sparrow McCaffrey, 26, catcher for the 1889 Columbus Solons of the American Association.
May 3 – Bob Ferguson, 49, infielder and manager of eight teams, known as sport's first switch-hitter and nicknamed "Death to Flying Things" for defensive skill, who captained an 1870 team which defeated Cincinnati Red Stockings after 84 straight wins, was president of National Association from 1872–1875, and set record for career games as umpire.
May 19 – Bill Mountjoy, 35, Canadian pitcher who posted a 31–24 record and a 3.25 ERA for the Cincinnati and Baltimore National League teams from 1883 to 1885.
June 23 – Jimmy Say, 32, third baseman/shortstop for five different teams in three leagues between 1882 and 1887.
August 25 – Yank Robinson, 34, second baseman for six teams of four different leagues, most prominently for the St. Louis Browns squads that won four American Association pennants from 1885 to 1888 and the 1886 World Series.
August 28 – Gracie Pierce, [?], second baseman and outfielder for five different teams in two leagues from 1882 through 1884, who later umpired in the National League and the Players' League.
September 16 – Terry Larkin, 38, National League pitcher and an 89-game winner from 1877 to 1879, who committed suicide by slitting his throat with a razor.
September 26 – Nick Reeder, 27, first baseman for the 1891 Louisville Colonels of the American Association.
October 16 – Ed Conley, 30, pitcher for the 1884 Providence Grays of the National League.
November 2 – William Houseman, 35, pitcher for the 1886 Baltimore Orioles of the American Association.
November 2 – Alamazoo Jennings, 43, catcher for the 1878 Milwaukee Grays of the National League.
November 8 – King Kelly, 36, Hall of Fame catcher and right fielder for the Chicago and Boston National League teams, known as a fiery and alert competitor that developed the hit-and-run and caused numerous refinements of sport's rules upon his exploitation of loopholes, who batted .308 lifetime with two batting titles, led the league in runs and doubles three times each, starred on five Chicago champion teams, and managed Boston to the 1890 Players' League title.
December 24 – Charlie Duffee, 28, outfielder for four teams in two different leagues, who led all American Association outfielders in assists in the 1889 and 1891 seasons.
December 25 – Tom Cahill, 26, utility player for the 1891 Louisville Colonels of the American Association.
December 30 – Jack McMahon, 25, first baseman and catcher who played from 1892 to 1893 for the New York Giants of the National League.

References

External links
1894 National League team stats at Baseball Reference